Cheriyo Captain is a 1995 Sri Lankan Sinhala comedy film directed by Roy de Silva and produced by Thilak Atapattu for TK Films. It is the second film of Cheriyo film series, which is sequel to Cheriyo Doctor. It stars Joe Abeywickrama, Sabeetha Perera and Cletus Mendis in lead roles with Sanath Gunathilake and Bandu Samarasinghe. Music for the film is done by Somapala Rathnayake. It is the 839th Sri Lankan film in the Sinhala cinema.

Plot
Varuni (Sabeetha) is the only daughter of Major (Mervyn). During a party, former army man Alphosus (Cletus) kidnap Varuni and ask Major that he needs to marry Varuni. Major does not accept it and recruit captain doson (Joe) and his team to save Varuni from Alphosus. Captain doson with his seven army man start searching Varuni at a vast jungle. Meanwhile, Varuni's boyfriend Rahal (Sanath) with his friend (Shashi) also come to know that Varuni is kidnapped by Alphonsus. They also started to search her. The film then revolves around how Captain Doson's funny army crew save Varuni from Alphonsus with the help of Rahal and destroy the bridge that connect the Army territory and Alphosus territory.

Cast
 Joe Abeywickrama as Captain Doson
 Sabeetha Perera as Varuni
 Cletus Mendis as Alphonsus
 Bandu Samarasinghe as Huntin/ Fruit salad
 Sanath Gunathilake as Rahal
 Freddie Silva as Ping Pong
 Tennison Cooray as Bantum
 Shashi Wijendra as Ravi, Rahal's friend
 Wimal Kumara de Costa as Kang Kung
 Mervyn Jayathunga as General Tagore
 Sumana Amarasinghe as Teena
 Sunil Hettiarachchi as Tarzan
 Susila Kottage as Guerrilla girl
 Mark Samson as Alphosus right-hand man
 Navanandana Wijesinghe as Tom Tom
 M. V. Balan as Pabul
 Udaya Kumari as Kumari
 Manel Chandralatha as Nancy
 Chitra Wakishta as Party goer
 Lilian Edirisinghe as Mrs. Rambo
 Berty Gunathilake as Party goer
 Lionel Deraniyagala as Party goer

Songs
The film consists with four songs.

References

1995 films
1990s Sinhala-language films
Films set in Sri Lanka (1948–present)

Sri Lankan sequel films